During 1956–57 season'Associazione Calcio Milan competed in Serie A and Coppa Latina.

Summary 
The team enforce for the season and transferred several players in such as  Ernesto Cucchiaroni, Carlo Galli, Per Bredesen, Luigi Zannier and Narciso Soldan, also return Alfio Fontana after one year. Another arrival was youngster striker Gastone Bean. Changes came with a new manager: Gipo Viani replacing Uruguayan Héctor Puricelli.

The Serie A saw Milan won its 6th championship ever. The new arrivals played with the previous block of rossoneri partners in the club  Lorenzo Buffon, Cesare Maldini, Nils Liedholm, as new captain with Nordahl out of the club, Mario Bergamaschi, Amos Mariani, Juan Alberto Schiaffino and Eros Beraldo.

The rossoneri competed in the last edition of  Latin Cup lost in semifinals (1-5) against Real Madrid. However, the team finished in 3rd place of the tournament after won 4–3 against Saint-Étienne.

Squad 

(vice-captain)

(Captain)

Transfers

Competitions

Serie A

League table

Matches

Latin Cup

Semifinals

Final 3º/4º place

Statistics

Squad Statistics

Appearances 
10.Osvaldo Bagnoli 
25.Gastone Bean 
22.Eros Beraldo 
22.Mario Bergamaschi 
29.Per Bredesen 
18.Lorenzo Buffon 
15.Ernesto Cucchiaroni 
7.Emiliano Farina 
34.Alfio Fontana 
23.Carlo Galli 
28.Nils Liedholm 
23.Cesare Maldini 
31.Amos Mariani 
2.Gianni Meanti 
3.Luigi Radice 
2.Cesare Reina 
2.Eduardo Ricagni 
29.Juan Alberto Schiaffino 
18.Narciso Soldan 
15.Francesco Zagatti 
36.Luigi Zannier

Goalscorers
17.Gastone Bean 
14.Carlo Galli 
9.Juan Alberto Schiaffino 
7.Per Bredesen 
5.Nils Liedholm 
4.Ernesto Cucchiaroni 
4.Emiliano Farina 
3.Amos Mariani 
1.Osvaldo Bagnoli 
1.Mario Bergamaschi 
1.Cesare Maldini 
1.Eduardo Ricagni

References

External links 

A.C. Milan seasons
Milan
Italian football championship-winning seasons